Tarrs is an unincorporated community and coal town in East Huntingdon Township, Westmoreland County, Pennsylvania, United States. It is located on Route 31, approximately three miles west of Mt. Pleasant. 

Tarrs has its own post office, with zip code 15688. It was established in April 1828. 

The town was the site of a coal mine, first developed in 1873 by an company called "D.A. Dillinger and Bro." Southwest Coal and Coke Company later acquired the mine. It was known as "No. 3" mine. Some 250 coke ovens were eventually located there. In 1906, historian John Newton Boucher described Tarrs as being located along "the South-West Branch of the Pennsylvania Railroad" between Ruffs Dale and Alverton. Boucher also mentions a location in Westmoreland County known as Tarr Station, presumably related to the railroad. About 500 people lived in Tarrs in 1910. The mine and coke works closed in 1923.

Tarrs is the only location in Pennsylvania known to have an active and running ACA Allertor 125 Civil Defense warning siren.

References

See also
ACA Allertor 125 warning/Civil Defense siren video on Wikimedia Commons.

Unincorporated communities in Westmoreland County, Pennsylvania
Coal towns in Pennsylvania
Unincorporated communities in Pennsylvania